The Abu Agag Formation is a Turonian geologic formation in Egypt and Sudan. Indeterminate fossil ornithischian tracks have been reported from the formation.

Description 
The formation comprises intercalated sandstones and highly bioturbated sand- and siltstone layers which are horizontal and wavy bedded. Horizontally laminated and thin bedded fine-grained sandstones as well as flaser- and ripple cross-lamination characterize a low-energy environment within this fluvial succession.

Fossil content 
The following fossils have been reported from the formation:

 Paranthodon africanus
 Planolites sp.
 Rhynchosauroides sp.	
 cf. Rotodactylus sp.
 Scoyenia sp.
 Spirodesmos sp.
 Dinosauria indet.
 ?Ornithischia indet.

See also 
 List of dinosaur-bearing rock formations
 List of stratigraphic units with indeterminate dinosaur fossils
 List of stratigraphic units with ornithischian tracks
 Indeterminate ornithischian tracks

References

Bibliography 
  

Geologic formations of Egypt
Geologic formations of Sudan
Upper Cretaceous Series of Africa
Turonian Stage
Sandstone formations
Siltstone formations
Fluvial deposits
Ichnofossiliferous formations